Tekhnika Molodezhi ("Technology for the Youth") is a Soviet, and eventually  Russian popular science magazine which has been published monthly since 1933.

History and profile
Tekhnika Molodezhi was established in 1933. During the Soviet era, it was often the first publisher of foreign science fiction authors in the USSR. The magazine had a science fiction section.

References

External links
Official website 
 Journal Archive 1933-2012 

1933 establishments in the Soviet Union
Magazines established in 1933
Popular science magazines
Russian-language magazines
Monthly magazines published in Russia
Science and technology magazines published in Russia
Magazines published in the Soviet Union
Soviet science fiction
Science and technology in the Soviet Union